This discography features albums released by guitarist Bill Frisell, released recordings of bands and projects he was/is a member of, and albums on which he appears as guest musician. Labels and dates indicate first release.

Albums

Albums

Live Download Series
The series is produced as a subsidiary label of Lee Townsend's Songline/Tone Field, and distributed online as lossless FLAC, MP3 and AAC files with printable cover art.

Compilations 
Works (ECM, 1988)
A-Collection (WEA, 2000)
Rarum: Selected Recordings of Bill Frisell (ECM, 2002)
The Best of Bill Frisell, Vol. 1 - Folk Songs (Nonesuch, 2009)

Collaborations 
 Theoretically with Tim Berne (Empire, 1984)
 Smash & Scatteration with Vernon Reid (Minor Music, 1985)
 Strange Meeting by Power Tools with Melvin Gibbs and Ronald Shannon Jackson (Antilles, 1987)
 Just So Happens with Gary Peacock (Postcards, 1994)
 American Blood/Safety in Numbers with Victor Bruce Godsey and Brian Ales (Intuition, 1995)
 Deep Dead Blue with Elvis Costello (Nonesuch, 1995)
 Time Again with Donald Rubinstein (Rhombus, 1997)
 Motion Pictures with Michael White (Intuition, 1997)
 Songs We Know with Fred Hersch (Nonesuch, 1998)
 Petra Haden and Bill Frisell with Petra Haden (True North, 2003)
 The Elephant Sleeps But Still Remembers with Jack DeJohnette (Golden Beams, 2006)
 Floratone with Matt Chamberlain, Lee Townsend, and Tucker Martine (Blue Note, 2007)
 Hemispheres with Jim Hall (ArtistShare, 2008)
 Floratone II with Matt Chamberlain, Lee Townsend, and Tucker Martine (Savoy, 2012)
 Lágrimas Mexicanas with Vinicius Cantuária (Naïve, 2011)
 Enfants Terribles with Lee Konitz, Gary Peacock, and Joey Baron (Half Note, 2012)
 Clock Face with Elvis Costello (Concord, 2020)

With Paul Motian and Joe Lovano 
All albums with Paul Motian are with saxophonist Joe Lovano, except as noted.
 Psalm with Ed Schuller and Billy Drewes (ECM, 1982)
 The Story of Maryam with Ed Schuller and Jim Pepper (Soul Note, 1984)
 Jack of Clubs with Ed Schuller and Jim Pepper (Soul Note, 1985)
 It Should've Happened a Long Time Ago (ECM, 1985)
 Misterioso with Ed Schuller and Jim Pepper (Soul Note, 1987)
 Monk in Motian with Geri Allen and Dewey Redman (JMT, 1988)
 On Broadway Volume 1 (JMT, 1989)
 One Time Out (Soul Note, 1989)
 On Broadway Volume 2 with Charlie Haden (JMT, 1989)
 Worlds with the Joe Lovano Wind Ensemble (Label Bleu, 1989)
 Bill Evans with Marc Johnson (JMT, 1990)
 Motian in Tokyo (JMT, 1991)
 On Broadway Volume 3 with Lee Konitz and Charlie Haden (JMT, 1991)
 Trioism (JMT, 1994)
 At the Village Vanguard (JMT, 1995)
 Sound of Love (Winter & Winter, 1997)
 I Have the Room Above Her (ECM, 2005)
 Time and Time Again (ECM, 2007)
 The Windmills of Your Mind with Petra Haden and Thomas Morgan w/o Lovano (Winter & Winter, 2011)

With John Zorn 
Albums mostly written and produced by Zorn, in part with Zorn playing alto saxophone (or other instruments), sometimes conducting the ensemble.
 The Big Gundown:  John Zorn Plays the Music of Ennio Morricone (Elektra/Nonesuch, 1986)
 "Godard" on French compilation Godard ça vous chante? (Nato, 1986, Tzadik reissue on Godard/Spillane, 1999)
 Cobra (Hathut, 1987)
 Spillane (Elektra/Nonesuch, 1987)
 News for Lulu with George E. Lewis (Hathut, 1988)
 Filmworks VII: Cynical Hysterie Hour (CBS/Sony (Japan), 1989)
 More News for Lulu (Hathut, 1990)
 Filmworks 1986–1990 (Elektra Nonesuch, 1992)
 Filmworks III: 1990–1995 (Toys Factory, 1996)
 New Traditions in East Asian Bar Bands (Tzadik, 1997)
 Masada Guitars (Tzadik, 2003)

With the Gnostic Trio (with Carol Emmanuel, Kenny Wollesen)
 The Gnostic Preludes (Tzadik, 2012)
 The Mysteries (Tzadik, 2013)
 In Lambeth (Tzadik, 2013)
 The Testament of Solomon (Tzadik, 2014)
 Transmigration of the Magus (Tzadik, 2014)
 The Mockingbird (Tzadik, 2016)
 The Book Beri’ah Vol 7--Netzach (Tzadik, 2019)
  Gnosis: The Inner Light (Tzadik, 2021)

With Naked City 
 Naked City (Elektra Nonesuch, 1989)
 Torture Garden (Shimmy Disc, 1990)
 Grand Guignol (Avant, 1992)
 Leng Tch'e (Toys Factory, 1992)
 Heretic (Avant, 1992)
 Radio (Avant, 1993)
 Absinthe (Avant, 1993)
 Live, Vol. 1: The Knitting Factory 1989 (Tzadik, 2002)

Albums featured

Film soundtracks
Beside his music for Buster Keaton's silent films Go West, The High Sign and One Week (see album section above), his collaborations with producer Hal Willner (cf. section above), and with John Zorn on his music for films (cf. section above), Frisell provided also original soundtracks for the following films
Gary Larson's Tales from the Far Side I & II directed by Gary Larson and Marv Newland (CBS, 1994 & 1997)
La scuola, feature film directed by Daniele Luchetti (1995)
American Hollow, documentary film directed by Rory Kennedy (HBO, 1999)
All Hat, feature film directed by Leonard Farlinger (O.S.T. on EmArcy, 2008)
Portrait of a Man, documentary film directed by Visa Koiso-Kanttila (2010)
The Great Flood, documentary film on the Great Mississippi Flood of 1927 directed by Bill Morrison (DVD, Icarus Films, 2014)
Change in the Air, feature film directed by Dianne Dreyer (2018)

His music was also exclusively used in
Frontline, Season 17, Episode 10: Pop, directed by Joel Meyerowitz (PBS, 1999)
Disfarmer: A Portrait of America on photographer Mike Disfarmer directed by Martin Lavut (2010)
The Lobster and the Liver: The Unique World of Jim Woodring on cartoonist Jim Woodring directed by Jonathan Howells (2010)

Personal appearances in music documentary films and TV shows 
Appearances as himself as musician and/or pundit
Bill Frisell: A Portrait directed by Emma Franz (2017)
In music documentary films
Icons Among Us on jazz today, directed by Lars Larson, Michael Rivoira and Peter J. Vogt (2009)
Weightless: A Recording Session with Jakob Bro featuring Jakob Bro, directed by Sune Blicher (2009)
In Good Time: The Piano Jazz of Marian McPartland on Marian McPartland, directed by Huey (2011)
Every Other Summer on Wilco's 2013 Solid Sound music festival, directed by Christoph Green and Brendan Canty (2015)
Carmine Street Guitars directed by Ron Mann (2018)
On TV shows
Spectacle: Elvis Costello with..., Season 1, Episode 7 and 9, accompanying Renée Fleming and Rufus Wainwright (Channel 4/CTV, both 2009)
The Late Show with Stephen Colbert, Season 2, Episode 156, as guest musician accompanying Paul Simon (CBS, 2017)

References

External links 
Bill Frisell discography on Frisell's website, Songline/Tonfield Productions

Bill Frisell discography at Discogs
Bill Frisell discography by Bryan Aaker, active until 2007

Jazz discographies
Rock music discographies
 
Discographies of American artists